Sankt Marienkirchen am Hausruck is a municipality in the district of Ried im Innkreis in the Austrian state of Upper Austria.

Geography
Sankt Marienkirchen lies in the Innviertel. About 18 percent of the municipality is forest, and 74 percent is farmland.

As of the 1st of January 2018 the municipality contained the following settlements:
 Baching 64
 Grausgrub 58
 Hatting 99
 Hof 63
 Jetzing 36
 Manaberg 12
 Obereselbach 38
 Pilgersham 79
 Sankt Marienkirchen am Hausruck 292
 Stocket 52
 Unering 46
 Untereselbach 18
 Kern 17
 Lehen 12
 Kleinbach 2.

References

Cities and towns in Ried im Innkreis District